Global Aviation Operations (Pty) Ltd t/a Global Airways and Lift is a South African airline headquartered in Johannesburg and based at OR Tambo International Airport.

History
Established in 2001 as Global Aviation Operations, the company created a "trading as" entity, Global Airways, to more properly reflect the nature of the business. The main business of Global Airways is the wet leasing (ACMI) of and operating of aircraft. Global Airways main strategy is to offer fully crewed, maintained and insured aircraft (ACMI) to established airlines.

Global Airways’ aircraft are available for ACMI Leases, Ad hoc, and Charter. The prime focus being on wet lease ACMI contracts and retaining Operational Control thus maintaining Global Airway's high operational standards in the most cost-effective manner.  The aircraft are also available on damp lease options subject to Global Airways’ operational and safety standards being met.

The Group's Aviation support services can provide an airline or client with aircraft, flight crew, cabin crew, base support staff, qualified flight dispatchers, aircraft maintenance and operational  control. Additionally, Global Airways can train the foreign cabin crew of the client to the level of their  crew. Global Airways believes in making  partnerships with their clients to benefit both businesses to the fullest.

Historically Global Airways was a McDonnell Douglas fleet operator, which included narrow body DC9 and MD82, and wide body DC10 Types. These aircraft were phased out between 2010 and 2017, as the company's fleet renewal strategy was to introduce Airbus A320 and A340 aircraft into the operation.

The company has held EASA TCO approval (EASA Third Country Operator – ZAF-0013) since 2016 and continues to operate and maintain aircraft in full compliance to EASA standards, allowing them to operate freely within all EU territories.

Challenges experienced in the aviation industry caused by COVID-19 presented an opportunity for Global Airways to re-think the way airlines are structured and to gain access to infrastructure and talented‚ specialized people. The industry underwent a fundamental change and new business models emerged in the industry where stronger customer orientation and more competition evolved.  With this in mind, Global Airways, trading under the name of Lift Airline, began domestic operations between Johannesburg and Cape Town and George in early December 2020 for the Southern Hemisphere summer season.

Fleet

Current fleet

As of November 2022, the Global Aviation fleet consists of the following aircraft:

Former fleet
The airline previously operated the following aircraft:

References

External links

Official website

Airlines of South Africa
Airlines established in 2001
Companies based in Johannesburg